Edward Golding may refer to:

Edward Golding (MP), Member of Parliament for Fowey
Sir Edward Golding, 1st Baronet (d. c. 1656), of the Golding baronets
Sir Edward Golding, 3rd Baronet (d. 1715), of the Golding baronets

See also
Edward Goulding, British baron, baronet, businessman and MP
Golding (surname)